Yaremchuk, also spelled Iaremchuk, is a surname. Notable people with the surname include:

 Aleksandr Iaremchuk (born 1995), Russian Paralympian
 Gary Yaremchuk (born 1961), Canadian ice hockey player
 Ivan Yaremchuk (born 1962), Soviet and Ukrainian footballer
 Ken Yaremchuk (born 1964), Canadian ice hockey player
 Mariya Yaremchuk (born 1993), Ukrainian singer
 Michael J. Yaremchuk, American medical doctor
 Nazariy Yaremchuk (1951–1995), Ukrainian singer
 Roman Yaremchuk (born 1995), Ukrainian footballer
 Sofiia Yaremchuk (born 1994), Ukrainian long-distance runner
 Viktor Iaremchuk (born 1991), Ukrainian gymnast

See also
 
 

Surnames
Ukrainian-language surnames